Rowing Victoria (RV) is the governing body for the sport of rowing in Victoria, Australia.

History
Rowing Victoria, formerly Victorian Rowing Association, formed on 7th October 1876. The Victorian Ladies' Rowing Association was formed on 31 January 1924. In 1979 the men's and women's associations merged.

Life Members

Current Life Members
Peter Antonie,
Kath Bennett,
Peter Fraser,
Andrew Guerin,
Caroline Judd,
James Lowe,
Mike McKay,
David Pincus,
James Tomkins,
Eric Waller,
Roger Wilson.

Past Life Members
Robert Aitken,
David Boykett,
Bill Bradshaw,
Norman Cairnes,
Jim Hardie,
Harvey Nicholson,
Brian Vear,
Noel Wilkinson,
Hubert Frederico,
David Deeble,
Bill Waterfield,
Ray Todd,
Jess Stockman,
May Laird,
Jess Pinkerton,
Bob Morell,
Ted Woolcock.

References

External links
 Official site

Sports governing bodies in Victoria (Australia)
Rowing in Australia
1925 establishments in Australia
Sports organizations established in 1925